Jin Ming (20 December 1913 – 15 March 1998) was a Chinese politician.  He was originally from Qingzhou city, in Shandong province.  In February 1932, he joined the Communist Youth League of China, and in the summer of the same year became a member of the Chinese Communist Party.  He was a member of the Central Advisory Commission under the 12th and 13th Central Committees.  He also served as the general secretary of the State Council of the People's Republic of China, the secretary of the CPC Hebei Committee (1979–1982), among other posts.  He died in Beijing in 1998.

1913 births
1998 deaths
People's Republic of China politicians from Shandong
Chinese Communist Party politicians from Shandong
Politicians from Weifang
Political office-holders in Hebei
Political office-holders in Hunan
People from Qingzhou